Cirripectes auritus, the blackflap blenny, is a species of combtooth blenny found in coral reefs in the Indo-West Pacific region.

This species reaches a length of  TL.

References

External links
http://www.marinespecies.org/aphia.php?p=taxdetails&id=219261

auritus
Fish described in 1981